The Freeze Building, at 18 W. Concho Ave. in San Angelo, Texas, was built in 1887.  It was listed on the National Register of Historic Places in 1997.

It is a two-story two-part commercial block building, constructed of local sandstone.  It was first a blacksmith and wheelwright shop.  It was built for Peter K. Freeze, a Danish blacksmith.

Freeze had 8 employees by 1888.  He started a three-story expansion later, but that was not completed.

References

National Register of Historic Places in Tom Green County, Texas
Buildings and structures completed in 1887
Blacksmith shops